Calibang is an island located west of Linapacan in northern Palawan in the Philippines. The island is a Tagbanwa Tribal Sanctuary consisting of less than a thousand native inhabitants. Visitors need approval by the Barangay Captain and/or tribal counsel prior to landfall.

External links
Palawan Environmental

Islands of Palawan